"I Wonder Who's Kissing Her Now" is a popular song. The music was written by Harold Orlob, the lyrics by Will M. Hough and Frank R. Adams. Orlob worked for Joseph E. Howard generating songs for Howard's productions and Howard presented the song as his own work for several years.
The song was published in 1909 and was first introduced in the 1909 musical The Prince of To-Night when it was performed by Henry Woodruff.

Early popular recordings were by Henry Burr (1909), Billy Murray (1910) and Manuel Romain (1910).
An instrumental version plays as background music when Malloy and Reed are cruising the parking lot of the Domino bar in 'Routine Patrol: The Drug Store Cowboys'.
In 1947 "I Wonder Who's Kissing Her Now" was used as the title song of a movie about Joseph E. Howard, leading to renewed popularity for the song. At this time Orlob brought suit to declare himself the composer, eventually reaching an out-of-court settlement with Howard for the two of them to receive joint credit. Orlob did not claim royalties.
An instrumental version is played in the background as Malloy and Reed cruise the parking lot of the Domino bar in 'Routine Patrol: The Drug Store Cowboys'.

Other versions
Bing Crosby – in the film The Star Maker (1939).
June Haver and others in the film I Wonder Who's Kissing Her Now (1947)
Perry Como with Ted Weems' Orchestra – a 1939 recording which reached the No. 2 position in the Billboard charts in 1947. Como recorded the song again on May 29, 1947.
Danny Kaye – recorded for Decca Records (catalog No. 24110) on June 15, 1947.
Ray Noble and His Orchestra (vocal by Snooky Lanson and the Sportsmen) – reached the No. 11 position in the Billboard charts in 1947.
Dinning Sisters – their version briefly charted in 1947.
Ray Charles – a single release (1951) (Ray Charles discography)
Henri Salvador - in a French translation by Henri Christiné titled Malgré tes serments (1957)
Crazy Otto released a version of the song on his 1958 EP Crazy Otto International, Vol. 2. as part of medley with the songs "Manhattan" and "Dungaree Doll".
Michael Holliday – a single release, recorded November 4, 1960.
Bobby Darin – The Unreleased Capitol Sides (1964).
Dean Martin – for his album Sittin' on Top of the World (1973)
Harry Nilsson - for his album A Little Touch of Schmilsson in the Night (1973)
George Hamilton IV – his single reached No.81 in the US Country charts in 1977. (George Hamilton IV#Discography).
Anne Murray (as "I Wonder Who's Kissing Him Now") – for her album I'll Be Seeing You (2004)

Lyrics

References

External links 
 Song lyric 
 Billy Murray (1909)

Songs about heartache
Songs about kissing
1909 songs
Songs written by Joseph E. Howard